Priscilla D. Mead (born February 7, 1944) was a member of the Ohio Senate from 2001 to 2002.  She was succeeded in office by Steve Stivers and was preceded by Eugene Watts. Prior to this, she served in the Ohio House of Representatives from 1993 to 2001 where she was Chairman of the House Public Utilities Committee.  She was a member of Upper Arlington City Council from 1982 to 1990 and served as president of council/mayor from 1986 to 1990.

References

External links
Profile on the Ohio Ladies' Gallery website

Republican Party members of the Ohio House of Representatives
Women state legislators in Ohio
Living people
1944 births
21st-century American politicians
21st-century American women politicians